Paragenipa is a genus of flowering plants belonging to the family Rubiaceae.

Its native range is Seychelles.

Species
Species:
 Paragenipa lancifolia (Bojer ex Baker) Tirveng. & Robbr.

References

Rubiaceae
Rubiaceae genera